Mitromorphidae  is a monophyletic family of small to medium-sized sea snails, marine gastropod mollusks in the superfamily Conoidea.

Bouchet, Kantor et al. elevated in 2011 the subfamily Mitromorphinae  (which at that point had been placed in the family Conidae) to the rank of family. This was based on a cladistical analysis of shell morphology, radular characteristics, anatomical characters, and a dataset of molecular sequences of three gene fragments.

Description
The Mitromorphidae have small to medium-sized shells with a high biconic mitriform shape, a paucispiral or multispiral protoconch up to 4.5 whorls, a short or indistinct siphonal canal, narrow aperture with up to 3 columellar pleats, indistinct anal sinus on a weakly pronounced subsutural ramp, fairly smooth surface with spiral sculptural elements.  There is no operculum, and the radula is relatively short, hypodermic in character with awl-shaped teeth, a swollen solid basal region, and may have a weak barb at the terminal end of the radular tooth.

Genera 
This is a list of the accepted names of genera in the family Mitromorphidae (the main reference for recent species is the World Register of Marine Species).
 Anarithma Iredale, 1916
 Arielia  Shasky, 1961
 Cymakra  Gardner, 1937
 †  Itia Marwick, 1931
 Lovellona Iredale, 1917
 Maorimorpha Powell, 1939
 † Mitrellatoma Powell, 1942
 Mitromorpha Carpenter, 1865
 Scrinium  Hedley, 1922

Genera brought into synonymy
 Ariella  Shasky, 1961: synonym of Arielia Shasky, 1961
 Citharopsis  Pease, 1868: synonym of Anarithma Iredale, 1916
 † Clinomitra Bellardi, 1889 : synonym of Mitromorpha Carpenter, 1865
 † Diptychomitra Bellardi, 1889 : synonym of Mitromorpha Carpenter, 1865
 Helenella  Casey, 1904: synonym of Mitromorpha Carpenter, 1865
 Mitramorpha : synonym of Mitromorpha Carpenter, 1865 (variant spelling)
 Mitrithara Hedley, 1922: synonym of Mitromorpha Carpenter, 1865
 Mitrolumna  Bucquoy, Dautzenberg & Dollfus, 1883: synonym of Mitromorpha Carpenter, 1865
 Vexiariella  Shuto, 1983: synonym of Arielia Shasky, 1961

References 

Vaught, K.C. (1989). A classification of the living Mollusca. American Malacologists: Melbourne, FL (USA). . XII, 195 pp

External links
  Casey T.L. (1904) Notes on the Pleurotomidae with description of some new genera and species. Transactions of the Academy of Science of St. Louis, 14, 123–170
 
 Worldwide Mollusc Species Data Base: Mangeliidae